The longnose sucker (Catostomus catostomus) is a species of cypriniform freshwater fish in the family Catostomidae. It is native to North America from the northern United States to the top of the continent.  It is also found in Russia in rivers of eastern Siberia, and thus one of only two species of sucker native to Asia (the other is the Chinese Myxocyprinus asiaticus).

Description
The body of the longnose sucker is long and round with dark olive or grey sides and top and a light underside.

Longnose suckers are easily confused with white suckers (Catostomus commersoni), which appear very similar. However, longnose suckers can be distinguished by their comparatively finer scales.

Distribution and ecology 
The longnose sucker inhabits cold, clear waters, including lakes, pools, rivers and streams, and occasionally also brackish waters. In North America, it ranges north from the Columbia, Delaware, Missouri and Monongahela river basins, as well as the Great Lakes basin. The Russian population, which sometimes is referred to as the Siberian sucker (C. c. rostratus), is found in the Yana, Indigirka, Alazeya and Kolyma river basins.

It is a bottom-feeding fish, eating aquatic plants, algae, and small invertebrates.  They are preyed upon by larger predatory fish, such as bass, walleye, trout, northern pike, muskellunge and burbot.

Relationship with humans  
They are fished for game and food and also used as bait to catch the larger predators. The International Game Fish Association (IGFA) world record sits at  taken from the St. Joseph River in Michigan on December 2, 1989 by angler Ben Knoll.

References

External links
 
 
 

Catostomus
Freshwater fish of the Arctic
Freshwater fish of the United States
Fish of the Great Lakes
Taxa named by Johann Reinhold Forster
Fish described in 1773